Roger Camille alias  Kiko (Heliopolis, 24 May 1936 – Brussels, 23 May 2006), was a Belgian cartoonist.

He was born in Egypt but he left this countryside when it was governed by Nasser in the 1960s. He started working in Spirou magazine where he created his famous 1965 character Foufi, originally created for a Lebanese newspaper. He worked as a publicist later, specially for the ice cream company Motta. He lived in Schaerbeek and died on the eve of his 70th birthday.

Two albums of Foufi were published by Dupuis in French and Dutch.

Belgian comics artists
Belgian people of Egyptian descent
2006 deaths
1936 births